Phyllanthus axillaris is a species of plant in the family Phyllanthaceae. It is endemic to Jamaica.

References

axillaris
Endangered plants
Endemic flora of Jamaica
Taxonomy articles created by Polbot